Le Bouchet-Saint-Nicolas is a commune in the Haute-Loire department in south-central France.

Personalities
The author Robert Louis Stevenson stayed at an inn in the village on 22 September 1878, having failed to find the nearby Lac de Bouchet, and his visit (recorded in his book Travels with a Donkey in the Cévennes) is commemorated by a statue of the author and his donkey, Modestine. The Robert Louis Stevenson Trail (GR 70), a popular long-distance path following Stevenson's approximate route, runs through the village.

Population

See also
 Lac du Bouchet
 Communes of the Haute-Loire department

References

Communes of Haute-Loire